Clark Randolph "Dudy" Noble (May 6, 1893 – February 2, 1963) was an American football, basketball, and baseball player, track athlete, coach, and college athletics administrator.

College
Born in Learned, Mississippi, Noble attended Mississippi State University (then known as Mississippi A&M College) in Starkville, Mississippi. During his college days he earned 14 varsity letters in four sports—football, basketball, baseball and track. He graduated in 1915.

Coaching and administrative career
After his college playing days were over, Noble went on to coach basketball, football, and most notably baseball at the college level for three different schools in his home state; Mississippi College, The University of Mississippi, and his alma mater Mississippi A&M.

Mississippi College
His first coaching job was as the head football coach at Mississippi College in 1916. While there he earned his first coaching victory when he led the Choctaws to a 13–6 upset over Mississippi A&M in a game played in Aberdeen, Mississippi.  The Choctaws finished the season with a record of 4–3.

Ole Miss

In 1917 Noble became the head football coach at the University of Mississippi (Ole Miss), a position he held for two seasons. During his two years as the Rebels' head coach he compiled a record of 2–7–1 and went 0–3 against his alma mater, Mississippi A&M. He holds the distinction of having been the only head coach to lose two Egg Bowls in one season (1918).   For the 1918–19 season he served as the head basketball coach at Ole Miss going 0–3. He had his most success in Oxford as the baseball coach compiling an overall record of 10–4 in the 1918 and 1919 seasons.

Mississippi State
Starting in 1920 Noble took over as skipper of the Mississippi State baseball team, a position that he held for 26 seasons until 1947 (MSU had no baseball team in 1944 and 1945). As head baseball coach he compiled a record 267–201–9 and won three Southern Intercollegiate Athletic Association championships. During his time as head baseball coach he awarded Dave "Boo" Ferris the first full baseball scholarship in Mississippi history. Noble also served one season as the Bulldogs' head football coach going 3–4–2 in 1922, including a victory over his former squad from Ole Miss.

From 1938 to 1959, Noble was also the athletic director at Mississippi State. During his tenure as athletic director he made several notable hires. Among those were football coaches Murray Warmath, Darrell Royal, and Allyn McKeen. McKeen left as MSU's all-time winningest head coach and is the only MSU coach elected to the College Football Hall of Fame.  He hired basketball coach Babe McCarthy who won three SEC championships and defied state authorities to take MSU to its first NCAA basketball tournament in 1963.  In 1953, he hired Jack Cristil who would go on to be the "Voice of the Bulldogs" for 58 years.

Death and honors
Noble died on February 2, 1963, at a hospital in Vicksburg, Mississippi; he was 69 years old.

The Mississippi State baseball field was named Dudy Noble Field in his honor in 1949.   He became a member of the Helms Baseball Hall of Fame in 1954, he was inducted into the Mississippi Sports Hall of Fame in 1961 and the American Baseball Coaches Association Hall of Fame in 1967.

Speaking on his time spent in Oxford Dudy Noble once told a Tennessee sports writer: “I already know what hell is like. I once coached at Ole Miss.”  Noble once owned a bird dog, a lazy mutt that refused to hunt.
Dudy Noble named him “Mr. Ole Miss.”

Head coaching record

Football

Basketball

Baseball

References

1893 births
1963 deaths
American men's basketball players
Baseball players from Mississippi
Basketball coaches from Mississippi
Basketball players from Mississippi
College men's track and field athletes in the United States
Mississippi College Choctaws football coaches
Mississippi State Bulldogs athletic directors
Mississippi State Bulldogs baseball coaches
Mississippi State Bulldogs baseball players
Mississippi State Bulldogs football coaches
Mississippi State Bulldogs football players
Mississippi State Bulldogs men's basketball players
Ole Miss Rebels baseball coaches
Ole Miss Rebels football coaches
Ole Miss Rebels men's basketball coaches
People from Learned, Mississippi
Players of American football from Mississippi